The following is a list of Arizona State Sun Devils softball seasons. Arizona State University is a member of the Pac-12 Conference of the NCAA Division I.  The Sun Devils are four time Women's College World Series champions, with two of those titles coming during the AIAW years and the remaining two under NCAA organization.  Arizona State has also appeared in the final event 19 times - 7 under the AIAW and 12 under the NCAA.  The team played its first season in 1967.

References

Arizona State
Arizona State Sun Devils softball